Cristian Vrînceanu (born 15 April 1956), commonly known as Chris Vranceanu, is a Romanian former football striker. He was part of Romania's national team in a tournament in New York City, but did not play in any game as he ran away from the team's cantonment, in order to escape from Nicolae Ceaușescu's Communist regime.

Honours
Dinamo București
Divizia A: 1974–75, 1976–77
New York Croatia
Cosmopolitan Soccer League: 1985–86

References

1956 births
Living people
Romanian footballers
Romania under-21 international footballers
Association football forwards
Liga I players
FC Dinamo București players
CS Corvinul Hunedoara players
Buffalo Stallions players
Footballers from Bucharest
Romanian expatriate footballers
Expatriate soccer players in the United States
Romanian expatriate sportspeople in the United States
Major Indoor Soccer League (1978–1992) players
Cosmopolitan Soccer League players
Expatriate footballers in Brazil
Romanian expatriate sportspeople in Brazil
Romanian defectors